von Buhler is a surname. Notable people with the surname include:

Cynthia von Buhler (born 1965), American artist and writer